Wool is the textile fibre obtained from sheep.

Wool may also refer to:

Organic matter

Alpaca wool, derived from fur of alpacas
Angora wool, derived from fur of rabbits
Cashmere wool, derived from fur of goats
Cotton wool, a British term for a fibrous mass of surgical cotton 
Llama wool, derived from fur of llamas
Wool, the commonly used term in the UK for woollen knitting yarn

Non-organic matter
Bronze wool, an abrasive derived from bronze
Glass wool, an insulating material derived from fiberglass
High temperature insulation wool, an insulating material derived from ceramic fibers
Mineral wool, an insulating material derived from minerals or metal oxides
Steel wool, an abrasive derived from steel

People
 Wool (surname)

Other uses 
Wool, the first book in the Silo series of science fiction novels by Hugh Howey
Wool (TV series), an upcoming American science fiction streaming television series, based on the first book in the Silo series by author Hugh Howey
Wool, Dorset, a village in England
Wool (band), the rock band from Washington, D.C.
WOOL-FM, a radio station in Vermont, United States

See also 
British Wool Marketing Board
 Bob Woolmer, English cricketer whose nickname is Woollie
Woolly, British slang for a sweater
Worshipful Company of Woolmen